

B
 Harvey W. Barnhill (ca. 1902-ca. late 1950s), one of the founders of Barnhill & McGee Airways
 Lucien Frank Barr (1903-1983), signer of the Alaska Constitution

C
 Pearl Laska Chamberlain (1909-2012), pilot and flight instructor based in Nome
 Marvel Crosson (1904-1929)

E
 Carl Ben Eielson (1897-1929)

F
 Richard Foster (1946-2009), son of Willie Foster, took over the family's air service

H
 Jay Hammond (1922-2005)

J
 Roy F. Jones (1893-1974)

M
 Linious "Mac" McGee (1897-1988), co-founder of Barnhill & McGee Airways, founder of McGee Airways
 Russel Hyde Merrill (1894-1929)

R
 Robert Campbell Reeve (1902-1980)

S
 Woodie Salmon (b. 1952), pilot in the Yukon Flats region, later served in the Alaska House

W
 Noel Wien (1899-1977)

Aviation history of the United States
 
Aviators